Michael Reese or Mike Reese may refer to:

 Mike Reese (Pennsylvania politician) (1978–2021), American politician and member of the Pennsylvania House of Representatives
 Mike Reese (Louisiana politician), American politician and businessman from Louisiana
 Mike Reese (sheriff), American law enforcement officer and sheriff of Multnomah County, Oregon

See also
Michael Rees, American artist
Michael Reese Hospital